Dargeh-ye Khalifeh Qoli (also Romanized as Dargeh-ye Khalīfeh Qolī; also known as Darkeh-ye Khalīfeh Qolī) is a village in Mahidasht Rural District, Mahidasht District, Kermanshah County, Kermanshah Province, Iran. At the 2006 census, its population was 46, in 14 families.

References 

Populated places in Kermanshah County